Stratton Hall is a civil parish in the East Suffolk district of Suffolk in eastern England. In 2005 its population was 30. It shares a parish council with nearby Levington. Stratton once had a church.

References

External links
Levington and Stratton Hall Parish Council

Civil parishes in Suffolk
Suffolk Coastal